Bob Andrews (born 27 October 1935) is a former international speedway rider from England and New Zealand.

Speedway career
Andrews was a leading rider in the 1960s and reached the final of the Speedway World Championship on four occasions in 1960, 1961, 1962 and 1964.

He rode in the top tier of British Speedway from 1956-1970, riding for various clubs.

Andrews was capped by England 21 times and Great Britain 12 times. He later emigrated to New Zealand and gained 27 caps for the country and rode the last of his World finals in New Zealand colours.

World final appearances

Individual World Championship
 1960 -  London, Wembley Stadium - 17th - 2pts
 1961 -  Gothenburg, Malmö Stadion - 5th - 10pts
 1962 -  London, Wembley Stadium - 6th - 9pts
 1964 -  Gothenburg, Ullevi - 13th - 4pts

World Pairs Championship
 1969* –  Stockholm, Gubbängens IP (with Ivan Mauger) – Winner – 28pts (10)
* Unofficial World Championships.

World Team Cup
 1961* -  Wrocław, Olympic Stadium (with Ron How / Peter Craven / Ken McKinlay) - 3rd - 21pts (6)
* 1961 for England.

References

1935 births
Living people
British speedway riders
New Zealand speedway riders
Cradley Heathens riders
Hackney Hawks riders
Wimbledon Dons riders
Wolverhampton Wolves riders